Godigamuwa West Grama Niladhari Division is a Grama Niladhari Division of the Horana Divisional Secretariat of Kalutara District of Western Province, Sri Lanka. It has Grama Niladhari Division Code 606.

Godigamuwa West is a surrounded by the Halapitiya, Walgama North, Rerukana, Samaranayakapura and Godigamuwa East Grama Niladhari Divisions.

Demographics

Ethnicity 
The Godigamuwa West Grama Niladhari Division has a Sinhalese majority (99.2%). In comparison, the Horana Divisional Secretariat (which contains the Godigamuwa West Grama Niladhari Division) has a Sinhalese majority (97.9%)

Religion 
The Godigamuwa West Grama Niladhari Division has a Buddhist majority (97.4%). In comparison, the Horana Divisional Secretariat (which contains the Godigamuwa West Grama Niladhari Division) has a Buddhist majority (97.0%)

References 

Grama Niladhari Divisions of Horana Divisional Secretariat